In India, a privy purse was a payment made to the ruling  families of erstwhile princely states as part of their agreements to first integrate with India in 1947 after the independence of India, and later to merge their states in 1949,  thereby ending their ruling rights.

The privy purses continued to be paid to the royal families until the 26th Amendment in 1971, by which all their privileges and allowances from the central government ceased to exist, which was implemented after a two-year legal battle. 

In some individual cases, privy purses were continued for life for individuals who had held ruling powers before 1947; for instance, HH Maharani Sethu Lakshmi Bayi's allowance was reinstated after a prolonged legal battle, and lasted until she died in 1985.

History 
When the British Crown partitioned British India and granted independence to the new Dominions of India and Pakistan, more than a third of the subcontinent was still covered by princely states, with rulers whose position and status within the Indian Empire had varied. In 1947, there were more than 560 such princely states in India, over which the British Crown had suzerainty, but not sovereignty. In 1947, princely states, numbering 555, covered 48% area of pre-independent India and constituted 28% of its population. Relations with them were determined by subsidiary alliances and other treaties,  establishing indirect rule. A protocollary system of gun salutes also determined the ranking of about 120 major states (Pakistan included), most,  however, were minor/petty 'non-salute states'. By the Indian Independence Act 1947, the Crown abandoned its suzerainty, leaving the rulers of the states free to choose to accede either to India or to Pakistan or to remain fully independent. Most had been so dependent on the Government of India that they had little choice but accession. By the eve of independence, most of the princely states had signed instruments of accession to India, and only one to Pakistan. Only a few states held out for complete independence after the British left India. Due to the diplomacy of Vallabhbhai Patel and VP Menon, Travancore, Bhopal and Jodhpur signed the instruments of accession before 15 August 1947. Even after independence three states vacillated, namely Jammu-Kashmir, Junagadh and Hyderabad, which were integrated later.

The instruments of accession needed the states to only cede defence, communications and foreign relations to India. Democratic institutions were introduced in these states, and it was only in 1949 that they were fully merged with India to form new states. Thus,  Travancore, and Cochin merged into India and formed the new state of Thiru-Kochi. Although  the royal families had been allowed to retain large sums of money as their privy purse in 1947; in 1949,  with the states and its revenues being entirely taken over by the Government of India, it was the Indian Government that provided the rulers and their families with privy purses that were determined by several factors such as the state's revenue, whether the state had been ranked as a salute state under the British Raj or not, antiquity of the dynasty, and so on. Dewan Jarmani Dass of Kapurthala says:

As defined from 1949 under Article 291 of the Indian Constitution, a privy purse would be a fixed, tax-free sum guaranteed to the former princely rulers and their successors. The sum was intended to cover all expenses of the former ruling families, including those incurred for religious and other ceremonies, and would be charged on the Consolidated Fund of India. With India remaining a member of the sterling area post-independence, and with the Indian rupee remaining pegged to the British pound sterling, the privy-purse payments constituted a significant outlay of government funds.

Recipients and amounts 
The privy purses were determined by several factors. Minor feudatories of the erstwhile princely states received whatever little allowances the princely governments had been providing them. For the 565 princely states, privy purses ranged from 5,000 per annum to amounts in millions. About 102 privy purses were of more than a 1 lakh with an upper ceiling of 2 lakh for all except 11 states. Only six of the most important princely states in India were provided with privy purses above 10 lakh (worth 8,898 oz of gold): Hyderabad, Mysore, Travancore, Baroda, Jaipur and Patiala. For certain other states, while certain amounts were guaranteed for the time being, it was liable to be reduced soon after due to deflation crisis in 1960s. Thus, Hyderabad, which received initially a privy purse of 42,85,714, was, a few years later, guaranteed 20,00,000 purse. The Government of India also, generally, reduced the allowances with every succession in the family.

Abolition 

A motion to abolish the privy purses, and the official recognition of the titles, was originally brought before the Parliament in 1970 and passed in the Lok Sabha, but failed by one vote to reach the required two-thirds majority in the Rajya Sabha, with 149 voting for and 75 against.

On 6 September 1970, the President of India passed an laconic order in respect of each of the rulers of former Indian states. In exercise of the power vested in him under Article 366(22) of the constitution, the President directed that with effect from the date of his order, all rulers ceased to be recognised as rulers. That resulted in the immediate termination of the privy purses received by the rulers, and the discontinuance of their personal privileges. Writ petitions under Article 32 of the constitution were filed by some of the rulers as test cases to question the orders. The Supreme Court ruled in favour of the rulers.

It was again proposed before  Parliament in 1971, and was successfully passed as the 26th Amendment to the Constitution of India in 1971. The then Prime Minister Indira Gandhi argued for the abolition based on equal rights for all citizens and the need to reduce the government's revenue deficit.

The amendment effectively derecognized the existing titles:

Aftermath 
The end of privy purse finally ended all the entitlements and special status of former rulers, thus turning them into ordinary citizens equal to other Indians, with no official recognition of their former ruling titles, special status, etc.

Many of the former royalty tried to protest against the abolition of the privy purses, primarily through campaigns to contest seats in the Lok Sabha elections of 1971. This included Mansoor Ali Khan Pataudi, the last and former Nawab of Pataudi, who contested from Gurgaon. Mansoor contested as a candidate for the Vishal Haryana Party, but received barely 5% of the vote in a two-way contest. Vijaya Raje Scindia and her son, Madhav Rao Scindia, however, won in the 1971 Lok Sabha polls.

See also
 Political integration of India
 Custodian for Enemy Property for India, for the government takeover of property of rulers who migrated to Pakistan
 Enemy Property Act, 1968, basis of Custodian for Enemy Property for India
 Central Wakf Council, in India for Muslim properties
 Evacuee Trust Property Board, in Pakistan for Hindu and Sikh properties

Notes

References

External links 
 Indian Princely States, on www.uq.net.au (as archived on web.archive.org), listing where known the historical privy purse in rupees

Political integration of India
Indira Gandhi administration